Paul Maubec, known by his pen name Chris Kutschera (13 May 1938 – 31 July 2017), was a French journalist, researcher, writer and specialist on the Middle East, with particular interest focused on Kurdish national movements. During his career he interviewed and photographed leading Kurdish figures, many of whom later took senior government positions, including: Mustafa Barzani, Dara Tawfiq, Masoud Barzani, Jalal Talabani, Nechirvan Barzani, Hoshyar Zibari and Barham Saleh.

Bibliography

 Le Mouvement national kurde, Flammarion, 1979
 Le Défi kurde ou le Rêve fou d'indépendance, Bayard Éditions, 1997
 Le Kurdistan, Guide littéraire, Éditions Favre, 1998
 Le Livre noir de Saddam Hussein, Oh ! Éditions, 2005
 Stories Kurdistan Histoires, 2007
 La Longue Marche des Kurdes 40 ans de reportage au Kurdistan, JePublie, 2011

Notes

References

External links
Chris Kutschera's website

1938 births
2017 deaths
French scholars
French journalists
Middle Eastern studies scholars
French male non-fiction writers